Gabriel Patrick Sanchez (born 1976) is an American lawyer and judge who is a United States circuit judge of the United States Court of Appeals for the Ninth Circuit.  He served an associate judge of the California Court of Appeal, First Appellate District from 2018 to 2022.

Early life and education 

A Los Angeles native, Sanchez graduated from Harvard-Westlake School in 1994. He received his Bachelor of Arts, cum laude, from Yale College in 1998, his Master of Philosophy in European Studies from the University of Cambridge in 2000 and he received his Juris Doctor from Yale Law School in 2005. He was a Fulbright Scholar in 1999 in Buenos Aires, Argentina.

Legal career 

Sanchez served as a law clerk for Judge Richard Paez of the United States Court of Appeals for the Ninth Circuit from 2005 to 2006. He was an associate at Munger, Tolles & Olson from 2006 to 2011, where he litigated civil matters at the trial and appellate levels. From 2011 to 2012, he worked as a deputy attorney general in the correctional law section of the California Attorney General's office. From 2012 to 2018, he worked as Deputy Legal Affairs Secretary under Governor Jerry Brown.

Sanchez helped draft the Public Safety and Rehabilitation Act of 2016. The act allowed certain non-violent defendants to be considered for parole, and established sentence credits for rehabilitation, good behavior, and education.

Judicial service

State judicial service 
In October 2018, Sanchez was nominated by Governor Brown to serve as an Associate Judge of the California Court of Appeal, First Appellate District, filling the vacancy created by the retirement of Justice Robert L. Dondero. His nomination was confirmed by the California Commission on Judicial Appointments on November 26, 2018, making Sanchez the first Latino to serve on that court. His service on the state court terminated when he was elevated to the Ninth Circuit Court.

Federal judicial service 

On September 8, 2021, President Joe Biden announced his intent to nominate Sanchez to serve as a United States circuit judge of the United States Court of Appeals for the Ninth Circuit. On September 20, 2021, his nomination was sent to the Senate. President Biden nominated Sanchez to the seat to be vacated by Judge Marsha Berzon, who will assume senior status upon confirmation of a successor. On November 3, 2021, a hearing on his nomination was held before the Senate Judiciary Committee. During his confirmation hearing, Republican senators questioned him about his role in the creation of Proposition 57 in 2016, which allowed for earlier parole for most inmates in California. On December 2, 2021, his nomination was reported out of committee by a 12–10 vote. On December 17, 2021, the United States Senate invoked cloture on his nomination by a 44–24 vote. On January 12, 2022, Sanchez was confirmed by a 52–47 vote. He received his judicial commission on January 24, 2022.

Notable cases 

On October 20, 2022, Sanchez wrote for a unanimous panel in favor of a whistleblower who leaked that SpecPro told him to violate the law when investigating the environmental impact of a U.S. Army project. Sanchez wrote that it is important to "encourage workplace whistleblowers to report unlawful acts without fear of retaliation."

See also 
List of first minority male lawyers and judges in California
List of Hispanic/Latino American jurists

References

External links 

1976 births
Living people
21st-century American judges
21st-century American lawyers
Alumni of the University of Cambridge
California lawyers
Judges of the United States Court of Appeals for the Ninth Circuit
Hispanic and Latino American judges
Hispanic and Latino American lawyers
Judges of the California Courts of Appeal
People associated with Munger, Tolles & Olson
People from Fullerton, California
United States court of appeals judges appointed by Joe Biden
Yale College alumni
Yale Law School alumni